William Dean Christensen (September 24, 1945 – October 31, 1990), known as The American Jack the Ripper, was a Canadian-American serial killer who killed and mutilated at least four people in Canada and the United States between 1982 and 1983. Suspected in 20 further killings across several countries, Christensen was convicted of two murders in Pennsylvania and sentenced to life in prison plus an additional 40 years in Maryland for rape, but he died three years into his sentence.

Early life 
Born in Bethesda, Maryland on September 24, 1945, the upbringing of Christensen is not fully known. His criminal pastimes began in 1969 when he picked up a 19-year-old hitchhiker in the Georgetown neighborhood of Washington D.C. He drove her to an isolated area where he raped and stabbed her 19 times in her arms, hands, and face. She survived the attack and Christensen was arrested. He was sentenced to five years in prison for this crime but instead of going to prison, he was transferred to a state facility for delinquents. He was released a year later in 1970. In 1974, Christensen and another man abducted a go-go dancer in Georgetown and drove her to a secluded area. The two took turns raping and beating the woman, with Christensen threatening her by saying "I will dismember you with an hacksaw". Eventually the two drove her to Christensen's parents' home, where they again raped her. The two were arrested and Christensen was sentenced to 16 years in prison. He was released early in 1980.

In July 1980 Christensen abducted a young woman at a bus stop in Washington D.C., drove her to one of his family members houses and raped her, but let her go afterwards. He was soon connected to the crime and arrest warrants were issued. In January 1981 Christensen attempted to move to Toronto but was arrested for falsifying information on his passport, due to which he spent 21 days in jail. Soon after his release, he created an alias called Richard Owen. On April 16, 1981, Owen kidnapped and raped a woman in Montreal. Arrested yet again, he pleaded guilty later that July and was sentenced to a year and six months in prison. Afterwards, it was discovered that Owen was actually Christensen, and since he was wanted in Washington D.C. for rape, US authorities contacted Canadian officials to transfer Christensen to a jail in Maryland. However, due to a clerical error, Christensen was mistakenly released.

Murders 
In April 1982, Christensen abducted 27-year-old Sylvie Trudel in Montreal. He brought her to an empty apartment where he raped, beat, and strangled her to death. Afterwards he decapitated and dismembered her body with a hacksaw. That same month Christensen strangled 26-year-old Murielle Guay, again dismembering the body afterwards. Both of their remains were discovered on April 27. Trudel was determined to have been dead for about 20 to 30 hours and Guay was determined to have been dead for 10 days. Christensen was almost immediately identified as a suspect due to him owning the apartment Trudel was found in, and witnesses identifying him as the last person seen with Guay. Christensen soon fled to the United States, while Canadian arrest warrants were issued to locate him. The following month Canadian detectives interviewed Christensen's parents at the family home in Maryland. The two admitted that they had met with their son and smuggled him $5,000. Over the next few months Christensen was allegedly spotted in six different states; Florida, New York, New Jersey, Georgia, Kentucky, and Pennsylvania.

Christensen, who during that time was actually residing between Trenton, New Jersey and Philadelphia, Pennsylvania, was using the alias "John Robert Schrader". On September 23, 1982, Christensen picked up 23-year-old go-go dancer Michelle Angiers in Scranton, Pennsylvania, and drove her to Dickson City, where he raped and stabbed her 30 times, killing her. On June 29, 1983, Christensen shot two men at an Amtrak railroad station in Trenton. The men survived. Afterwards, he created another alias called Jeffrey Shrader. On December 4, 1983, Christensen shot and killed 51-year-old Joseph Connelly outside a bar after an argument. Witnesses to the shooting reported what they had seen, and Christensen was located a few hours later and arrested.

Trial and death 
Although he had been arrested, Christensen was not yet immediately identified and continued to claim his name was Jeffrey Shrader. He was soon convicted of Connelly's murder. The FBI was brought in to identify Shrader, and collected his fingerprints and uploaded into a database, though the FBI erroneously said the fingerprints did not match anyone on their radar. However, a few days after his conviction, Shrader was positively identified as Christensen. Having been on the run for almost two years, US and Canadian authorities suspected Christensen had killed over a dozen people since then. Due to this, and the brutality of his known killings, Pennsylvania police constable Bill McAndrew labeled Christensen "a real American Jack the Ripper", (Jack the Ripper was a serial killer who murdered and mutilated five prostitutes in London in 1888 and was never caught) a name which stuck with media outlets who soon coined that as the official nickname for Christensen. In early 1985 Pennsylvania investigators linked Angiers' murder to Christensen after finding a bloody knife and hacksaw in his home. Christensen was convicted of Angiers murder in 1990, for which he was sentenced to serve 10 to 20 years in prison. He was also brought to Maryland as he had not been prosecuted for the 1981 rape of a woman there. He was convicted and sentenced to 40 years in prison. In 1990 a cellmate of Christensen revealed that he had allegedly confessed to killing 24 people; two in England, four in Canada, and sixteen in the United States. The claims were investigated but nothing was proven.

On October 31, 1990, Christensen died of natural causes while imprisoned at State Correctional Institution – Huntingdon. His death was not reported until July 1991.

See also 
 List of serial killers by country
 List of serial killers in the United States

Notes

References 

1945 births
1982 murders in the United States
1983 murders in the United States
1990 deaths
20th-century American criminals
20th-century Canadian criminals
American male criminals
American people convicted of murder
American prisoners sentenced to life imprisonment
American rapists
American serial killers
Canadian male criminals
Canadian people convicted of murder
Canadian people imprisoned abroad
Canadian rapists
Canadian serial killers
Fugitives
Male serial killers
People from Bethesda, Maryland
Serial killers who died in prison custody